A truffle hog is any domestic pig used for locating and extracting the fruit bodies of the fungi known as truffles from temperate forests in Europe and North America. Pigs have an exceptional sense of smell, and are able to identify truffles as deep as three feet underground. It is thought that the natural sex hormones of the male pig are similar to the smell of the truffles; pigs also have a natural affinity for rooting in the earth for food. However, they are trained to hunt truffles by walking on a leash through suitable groves with a keeper.

History

The use of pigs to hunt truffles is said to date back to the Roman Empire, but the first well-documented use comes from the Italian Renaissance writer and gastronomist, Bartolomeo Platina, in the 15th century. Later references to truffle pigs include John Ray in the 17th century.

In 1875, a truffle hog could cost up to 200 francs. A skilled truffler could more than make up for this investment from the high price of truffles on the gourmet food market.

It is frequent for the hog to be a family pet of the truffler.

In Italy, the use of pigs in truffle hunting has been prohibited since 1985, as the animals can cause damage to the mycelia of truffles while digging, reducing the production rate for a number of years.

Truffle hounds
Today, dogs—known as truffle hounds—are commonly used for gathering truffles in place of truffle hogs, as pigs have been known to eat too many truffles in the field. Unlike pigs, dogs have no natural affinity for truffles, and must be specially scent-trained to locate them. A trained Lagotto Romagnolo (an Italian dog breed recognized for its truffle-finding capability) can cost up to $10,000. Stealing such dogs is a common crime among rival hunters. However, traditionalists argue that truffle hogs have more sensitive noses and their particular taste for truffles leads to a more devoted animal.

See also

 Scent hound

References

Pigs
Working animals
Truffles (fungi)